The Massairo Okamura State Park is a state park in the city of Cuiabá, capital of Mato Grosso, Brazil. 
It preserves an area of typical cerrado forest in a densely urbanised area.

Location

It lies to the east of the Avenida Hist. Rubens de Mendonça and north of the Avenida Ver. Juliano de Costa Marques, near the Universidade de Cuiabá, Pantanal.
About 500 people visit the park daily.
The park contains the Praça Nações Indígenas (Indigenous Nations Plaza), a tribute to the Bororo people who inhabited the region in pre-colonial times.

Environment

The park provides a green space with typical cerrado vegetation in the centre of a highly urbanized area, and helps preserve the headwaters of the Barbado and Moinho streams.
129 species of trees or plants have been catalogued along the park trails.
They include cerrado species and medicinal plants such as lixeira, jatobá, cumbaru, angico, carvão vermelho, quina, aroeira, oiti (Licania tomentosa) and sete cascas.
It is home to howler monkeys.

History

The Massairo Okamura Ecological Reserve was created by law 7.313 of 1 September 2000 as an ecological reserve in the political/administrative centre of the Mato Grosso state government.
On 21 September 2001 it was reclassified as the Massairo Okamura State Park.
A management plan was published on 31 December 2012, but was not made official through an ordinance.
The advisory council was reactivated on 16 December 2014.

Notes

Sources

State parks of Brazil
Protected areas of Mato Grosso
Protected areas established in 2000
2000 establishments in Brazil